Terence Marsh (14 November 1931 – 9 January 2018) was a British production designer. He won two Academy Awards and was nominated for another two in the category of Best Art Direction.

Production designer
 Rush Hour 2 (2001)
 The Green Mile (1999)
 The Shawshank Redemption (1994)
 Clear and Present Danger (1994)
 Basic Instinct (1992)
 Havana (1990)
 The Hunt for Red October (1990)
 Bert Rigby, You're a Fool (1989) 
 Haunted Honeymoon (1986)  (also co-writer)
 To Be or Not to Be (1983)
 The World's Greatest Lover (1977)
 A Bridge Too Far (1977)
 The Adventure of Sherlock Holmes' Smarter Brother (1975)
 The Glass Menagerie (1973) (TV)
 The MacKintosh Man (1973) (as Terry Marsh)

Awards
Marsh won two Academy Awards for Best Art Direction and was nominated for two more:
Won
 Doctor Zhivago (1965)
 Oliver! (1968)
Nominated
 Scrooge (1970)
 Mary, Queen of Scots (1971)

He has also been nominated for three BAFTA Awards for Best Production Design:
 Scrooge (1970)
 A Bridge Too Far (1977)
 The Hunt for Red October (1990)

References

External links

1931 births
2018 deaths
British film designers
British art directors
Best Art Direction Academy Award winners
Deaths from cancer in California
Film people from London